The Mishana tyrannulet (Zimmerius villarejoi) is a species of bird in the family Tyrannidae. It is endemic to two geographically separated regions in northeastern Peru.  It is speculated that the two populations might represent separate species entirely. 

Its natural habitat is subtropical or tropical moist lowland forests. It is threatened by habitat loss.

Its diet consists of insects and fruit, with some evidence suggesting that they consume seeds as well.  It forages in the forest canopy for seeds as well as small arthropods.

References

External links
BirdLife Species Factsheet.

Mishana tyrannulet
Birds of the Peruvian Amazon
Endemic birds of Peru
Mishana tyrannulet
Taxonomy articles created by Polbot